During the 1997–98 English football season, Middlesbrough F.C. competed in the Football League First Division.

Season summary
Middlesbrough were promoted to the Premier League, also reaching the League Cup final, where the club lost its third domestic cup final in a year. Just reaching the final was a huge success, though, with the club not playing in the top flight and having lost international star players Fabrizio Ravanelli and Juninho following relegation.

The season also saw the arrivals of well-known players such as Paul Gascoigne from Rangers, Marco Branca from Inter Milan and Paul Merson from Arsenal, with Boro bucking the trend of players only being attracted by top-flight clubs.

Final league table

Results
Middlesbrough's score comes first

Legend

Football League First Division

FA Cup

League Cup

Squad

References

Middlesbrough F.C. seasons
Middlesbrough